The State Company for Public Services of San Marino (Azienda Autonoma di Stato per i Servizi Pubblici, also known as AASS) is a state-owned joint-stock company in the Republic of San Marino that was created in 1981 to run the local system of transport, to manage the distribution of water, electricity and gas methane and the collection of waste. All services that were previously supplied in an unsystematic way by private Italian companies.

For what regards public transport, it manages ten lines of buses and the Funivia di San Marino, a very used cable car.

See also 
 San Marino

 Economy of San Marino
 Transport in San Marino

External links 
http://www.aass.sm/site/home.html

Transport in San Marino